Michaela Moua (born 18 August 1976 in Helsinki) is a Finnish former basketball player.

Born of Finnish mother and Ivorian father Moua started her career in the Finnish women's basketball league at the age of 16. In 1996 she joined the Ohio State Buckeyes being the first foreign female basketball player in the Ohio State University. After four seasons of college basketball Moua returned to Europe and played for several clubs in France, Switzerland, Croatia, Italy and Finland. She capped 124 times for the Finland women's national basketball team. She was nominated in 2021 "coordinator for anti-racism" of the European Commission.

Ohio State statistics

Source

Career
  Pussihukat (1992–1996)
  Ohio State Buckeyes (1996–2000)
  ESB Villeneuve-d'Ascq (2000–2002)
  Acer Priolo (2002–2003)
  Ovronnaz-Martigny (2003–2005)
  Zala Volán (2005–2006)
  Gospić Osiguranje (2006–2007)
  Juventus Pontedera (2007–2008)
  Université BC Neuchâtel (2008–2009)
  Espoo Basket Team (2009–2010)
  Keravan Energia Team (2009–2011) 
  Forssan Alku (2010–2011)

Honors
Swiss Championship: 2004, 2005

References

1976 births
Living people
Finnish expatriate basketball people in the United States
Finnish people of Ivorian descent
Finnish women's basketball players
Ohio State Buckeyes women's basketball players
ŽKK Gospić players